Borthwood is a hamlet on the Isle of Wight, adjacent to Borthwood Copse, the National Trust woodland. Borthwood includes some holiday cottages and a pet kennel. At the 2011 Census the Post Office specified that the population of the hamlet was included in the civil parish of Newchurch, Isle of Wight.

Borthwood was the site of brickmaking operations in the past.

References

Villages on the Isle of Wight